Ivane II Mkhargrdzeli was a 13th-century Georgian noble and mandaturtukhutsesi (Mandator) of Georgia.

Biography 
In 1260, David VII Ulu rebelled against its Mongol overlord. Some of the nobles supported him, while most of them (Ivane Mkhargrdzeli, Grigol Surameli, Kakha Toreli etc.) went to the Khan. In 1262, David VII had to make peace with the Mongols and returned to Tbilisi, effectively splitting the country into two parts. After death of David, Georgian nobles took son of the King, Demetrius II and they came to Ivane, who went with them to the Ilkhanate around 1271-1272, to attend coronation of Demetrius. In 1288, Ivane fought campaign against Arghun Khan alongside Demetrius II.

Sources 
Shoshiashvili, N., Georgian Soviet Encyclopedia, vol. 7, p. 271. Tbilisi, 1984

References 

House of Mkhargrdzeli
Nobility of Georgia (country)
Military personnel from Georgia (country)
13th-century people from Georgia (country)
Year of birth unknown
Politicians from Georgia (country)
Georgian people of Armenian descent